South Westshore is a neighborhood within the city limits of Tampa, Florida. As of the 2000 census the neighborhood had a population of 4,597. The ZIP Codes serving the neighborhood are 33611 and 33629. The neighborhood is located just south of the Westshore Business District.

Geography
South Westshore boundaries are the Leona Street to the north, Tampa Bay to the west, Gandy Blvd. to the south, and Manhattan Avenue to the east.

Demographics
Source: Hillsborough County Atlas

At the 2000 census there were 4,597 people and 2,328 households residing in the neighborhood. The population density was 5,258/mi2.  The racial makeup of the neighborhood was 93.0% White, 2.0% African American, 0% Native American, 3.0% Asian, less than 1.0% from other races, and 1.0% from two or more races. Hispanic or Latino of any race were 9.0%.

Of the 2,328 households 21% had children under the age of 18 living with them, 38% were married couples living together, 5% had a female householder with no husband present, and 8% were non-families. 45% of households were made up of individuals.

The age distribution was 18% under the age of 18, 23% from 18 to 34, 24% from 35 to 49, 13% from 50 to 64, and 24% 65 or older. For every 100 females, there were 88.3 males.

The per capita income for the neighborhood was $28,025.

See also
Neighborhoods in Tampa, Florida

References

External links
South Westshore Neighborhood Civic Association

Neighborhoods in Tampa, Florida